The Commonwealth Labour Party was a minor political party in the Bahamas.

History
The party was established by Assembly member Randol Fawkes. It nominated eight candidates for the 1972 general elections, but received only 254 votes and failed to win a seat. Fawkes revived the party to contest a by-election in St Barnabas in 1974, but finished third behind Sidney Outten and Arthur Foulkes.

References

Defunct political parties in the Bahamas
Labour parties
Political parties with year of disestablishment missing